Liu Cong (died 31 August 318), courtesy name Xuanming, nickname Zai, formally Emperor Zhaowu of Han (Zhao), was an emperor of the Xiongnu-led Chinese Han Zhao dynasty. He captured the Emperor Huai of Jin and the Emperor Min of Jin, and executed them back in Pingyang after forcing them to act as cupbearers. These raids finally forced the Jin dynasty to move its capital from Luoyang to Nanjing.

Liu Cong's reign was one filled with contradictions.  He was a ruler who was obviously intelligent and capable of logical reasoning, and during his father Liu Yuan's reign, he was a capable general as well.  On the other hand, as his reign progressed, he became increasingly cruel, unstable, extravagant, and unable to listen to proper advice.  Toward the end of his reign, any official who dared to speak against his actions faced potential death.  During his reign, both he and the Han Zhao state displayed great potential, as Han Zhao expanded from a small state occupying modern southern Shanxi to encompassing nearly all of modern Shanxi, Shaanxi, eastern Gansu, and significant portions of Shandong, Hebei, and Henan—although the eastern half of the empire was under the control of the general Shi Le and arguably only nominally under Han Zhao's rule. Liu Cong and his state would never realize their potential.

Early life and career 
Liu Cong was Liu Yuan's fourth son, by his concubine Consort Zhang.  When he was young, he was considered both intelligent and strong, and when he studied in the Jin capital Luoyang, his knowledge was said to have impressed the Jin officials Le Guang (樂廣) and Zhang Hua.  Eventually, he was invited by the ambitious Sima Yong, the Prince of Hejian, to be on his staff, but he was concerned that, since his father was on the staff of Sima Ying the Crown Prince, he would be considered to have divided loyalties.  He therefore fled to Sima Ying and served as a junior officer.

After Liu Yuan declared himself the Prince of Han, thus establishing Han Zhao, in 304, he made Liu Cong one of his key generals and created him the Prince of Chu.  In 309, in conjunction with Shi Le, he had a major victory over the Jin general Wang Kuang (王曠) at Changping (長平, in modern Jincheng, Shanxi).  Upon the victory, however, he prematurely tried to advance on Luoyang and was defeated by the Jin general Huan Yan (桓延), who tricked him by pretending to surrender.  However, several months later, he tried again to capture Luoyang in conjunction with Wang Mi (王彌), but as he besieged the city, the Jin regent Sima Yue the Prince of Donghai was able to make surprise attacks from inside the city, and Liu Cong suffered several repeated attacks.  Liu Yuan then recalled him back to the capital Pingyang (平陽, in modern Linfen, Shanxi).

In summer 310, Liu Yuan grew ill.  He created Liu Cong's older brother Liu He (by Empress Huyan) crown prince, and commissioned his other sons Liu Yu (劉裕) the Prince of Qi, Liu Long (劉隆) the Prince of Lu, and Liu Ai (劉乂) the Prince of Beihai with substantial troops at the capital, in addition to the large army that Liu Cong already had, with intent that they assist Liu He with governance and military matters.  A group of officials, both Xiongnu and Han, were given various responsibilities in assisting Liu He. However, three officials were left out—Liu He's uncle Huyan You (呼延攸), Liu Cheng (劉乘) -- who had prior grudges with Liu Cong—and Liu Rui (劉銳) the Prince of Xichang. They were disgruntled, and they persuaded the already suspicious Liu He that he could not be safe if his brothers maintained large forces in or near the capital. Three days after Liu Yuan's death, under Liu He's orders, these officials commenced surprise attacks on Liu He's four brothers—Liu Rui against Liu Chong, Huyan You against Liu Yu, Liu Cheng against Liu Long, and Tian Mi (田密) and Liu Gui (劉璿) against Liu Ai. Once Tian and Liu Gui got on the way, however, they did not attack Liu Ai but instead escorted him to alert Liu Cong, who then prepared for the confrontation. Liu Rui withdrew his troops. Over the next two days, Liu Yu and Liu Long were defeated and killed. Two days later, Liu Cong besieged the palace and killed Liu He, Liu Cheng, Liu Rui, and Huyan. After initially offering the throne to Liu Ai, Liu Cong then assumed the throne himself.

Early reign 
After Liu Cong took the throne, he created his brother Liu Ai crown prince, promising to eventually give Liu Ai the throne that he offered to Liu Cong instead.  He created his wife Princess Huyan empress, and created her son Liu Can the Prince of Jin, putting him in charge of much of his troops, along with his cousin Liu Yao the Prince of Shi'an.  Both Liu Yuan's empress Empress Dan and Liu Cong's own mother Consort Zhang were honored as empresses dowager.

Later in 310, Crown Prince Ai's mother, Empress Dan died—said to be of shame after her affair with Liu Cong was discovered by her son Liu Ai.  After she died, Liu Cong's favor for his brother quickly waned, although he was said to be keeping him as crown prince still because of his love for her.  Empress Huyan, however, began to try to persuade him to create Liu Can crown prince instead, and he began to consider the matter.

Liu Cong continued to put up pressure against Jin and its capital Luoyang.  His generals Liu Yao, Liu Can, Shi Le, and Wang Mi continued to defeat Jin forces that they encountered easily, capturing cities and killing Jin officials, but continued to have difficulty holding cities permanently.  However, they rendered the Jin heartland stripped and barren.  In spring 311, Shi Le crushed the remaining major Jin force in the central China region, previously commanded by Sima Yue, which was trying to head east after his death.  Shi had the Jin officials and generals he captured all executed and burned Sima Yue's body.  Luoyang was left defenseless, and at Liu Cong's orders, summer that year, Wang, Shi, Liu Yao, and Huyan Yan converged on Luoyang and captured it and the Emperor Huai of Jin, taking him to the Han Zhao capital Pingyang. This capture of Jin capital is known as the Disaster of Yongjia.  Wang suggested that the capital be moved to Luoyang, but Liu Yao opposed and burned much of Luoyang, and Liu Cong did not seriously consider Wang's suggestion afterwards.  In winter 311, Shi ambushed Wang at a feast and seized Wang's troops, and afterwards, while continuing to show outward loyalty to Han Zhao, became effectively independent.  Indeed, his intent from that point on appeared to be enlarging his own personal dominion.

In spring 312, Empress Huyan died.  In less than a month, Liu Cong began to take a large number of his high-level officials' daughters and granddaughters as concubines, including a number of them with the family name Liu—daughters and granddaughters of his official Liu Yin (劉殷) -- which Crown Prince Ai opposed due to the general prohibition against endogamy.  However, Liu Cong rationalized that these Liu women were ethnically Han, and he himself was ethnically Xiongnu, and therefore could not have come from the same ancestry.  From this point on, Liu Cong was said to have been spending all his time with these women and rarely spent time to handle government matters.

Also in spring 312, Liu Cong created the former Jin emperor the Duke of Kuaiji.  Once, after inviting the duke to a feast, Liu Cong commented on a meeting they had while the former emperor was still the Prince of Yuzhang, leading to a notable colloquy in which the duke skillfully flattered the Han Zhao emperor.  The next day, Liu Cong gave one of his favorite concubines, one of Liu Yin's granddaughters, to the duke as a gift, creating her as the Duchess of Kuaiji.

In summer 312, the first real signs of trouble of Liu Cong's reign came, as he executed a prince in charge of river matters and a duke in charge of construction on trivial matters—the prince for failing to supply his court with sufficient fish and crabs, and the duke for failing to complete two palaces on time.  When the general Wang Zhang (王彰) tried to persuade him to control his behavior, he became enraged and wanted Wang killed, but imprisoned Wang after Wang's daughter, a concubine of his, interceded.  Later, he regretted his actions and released and promoted Wang, but this incident started a pattern of impulsive actions, often with cruelty, that would plague the rest of Liu Cong's reign.

Later in summer 312, Liu Cong wanted to create Liu Yin's daughter Liu Ying (劉英) empress to replace Empress Huyan, but at his mother Empress Dowager Zhang's insistence, he created another concubine, Empress Zhang Huiguang—a daughter of his cousin Zhang Shi (張寔—not to be confused with the contemporaneous Jin official of the same name, whose domain later evolved into Former Liang) -- empress.

In fall 312, Han Zhao forces, under Liu Can and Liu Yao, dealt a serious blow to the Jin general Liu Kun (劉琨) the governor of Bing Province (并州, modern northern and central Shanxi), who had been a constant threat to Han Zhao, capturing Liu Kun's headquarters at Jinyang (晉陽, in modern Taiyuan, Shanxi) and killing Liu Kun's parents.  While Liu Kun was able to recapture Jinyang with the assistance of the Xianbei chief Tuoba Yilu the Duke of Dai, he would not pose a serious threat to Han Zhao from that point on.

In spring 313, an incident would lead to Liu Cong's execution of the former Jin emperor, the Duke of Kuaiji.  At the imperial new year celebration, Liu Cong ordered him to serve the high-level officials wine, and former Jin officials Yu Min (庾珉) and Wang Juan (王雋) could not control their emotions at seeing his humiliation, and cried out loud. This made Liu Cong angry, and he falsely accused Yu and Wang, along with a number of former Jin officials, of being ready to betray Pingyang and offer it to Liu Kun. He then executed those former Jin officials and poisoned the former emperor.  He took the Duchess of Kuaiji, formerly awarded to the duke, back as a concubine.

Later in spring 313, Liu Cong's mother Empress Dowager Zhang died.  Her grandniece, Empress Zhang, was so depressed and mournful after the empress dowager's death that she died as well.  Liu Cong created Liu Yin's daughter Liu E to replace her, and ordered that a palace be built for her.  His minister Chen Yuanda tried to persuade that it was overly wasteful, and Liu Cong, in anger, ordered Chen's execution.  However, the new empress interceded, and Chen was spared and further promoted.  For the next year, under Empress Liu's and Chen's advice, Liu Cong was said to have corrected his behavior to some extent.

In summer 313, the nephew of the deceased Emperor Huai of Jin, Sima Ye, declared himself emperor (as Emperor Min of Jin) in Chang'an, but due to the weakness in his forces did not pose a serious threat to Han Zhao.  Still, this move drew Liu Cong's attention, and for the next several years, Chang'an would become a major target for Han Zhao forces.

In spring 314, Empress Liu died, and it was said that from that point on, Liu Cong's palace would be thoroughly in a confused state, and Liu Cong's own personal behavior appeared to degenerate after this, without her counsel.

Late reign 
In 314, Liu Cong made his son Liu Can the prime minister, with paramount powers.  This brought fear in the heart of his brother, the crown prince Liu Ai, whose associates subsequently suggested in 315 that he start a coup and overthrow Liu Cong.  Liu Ai did not agree to the plot, but news leaked anyway.  Liu Cong put Liu Ai under house arrest.

Later in 315, Liu Cong took two of his general Jin Zhun's daughters, Jin Yueguang (靳月光) and Jin Yuehua (靳月華) into his palace, and created three empresses—Jin Yueguang as Upper Empress, Jin Yuehua as Right Empress, and Consort Liu (might have been Liu Yin's granddaughter) Left Empress—against the custom that an emperor should only be one empress for the emperor at one time.  Later that year, Chen Yuanda revealed to him that the Upper Empress had been committing adultery, and Liu Cong felt compelled to depose her; she committed suicide in shame, and Liu Cong, missing her beauty, greatly resented Chen for revealing her adultery.

In fall 315, Liu Cong, to appease the ever growing power of Shi Le, commissioned Shi with imperial powers in the eastern empire (which Shi controlled in any case).

Around this time, he also became extremely trusting of the eunuchs Wang Chen (王沈), Xuan Huai (宣懷), and the servant Guo Yi (郭猗), entrusting all government matters to them and cancelling regular meetings with officials, letting Wang, Xuan, and Guo serve as communicators between him and the officials.  This led to Wang, Xuan, and Guo becoming free to act at their whim, and they became greatly corrupt, in cooperation with Jin Zhun.  A number of officials who dared to speak out against these men were executed.  Both Guo and Jin had prior grudges against Crown Prince Ai, and they persuaded Liu Can into believing that Crown Prince Ai would try to depose Liu Cong and kill him, presenting Liu Can with false evidence of such a plot.  Liu Can therefore began to plot how to remove his uncle.

In fall 316, Liu Cong sent Liu Yao to attack Chang'an, and Liu Yao captured it and the Jin emperor, sending him to Pingyang, thus ending the so-called Western Jin Dynasty (although Jin would not actually end, as its Prince of Langye, Sima Rui, then safely south of the Yangtze River at Jiankang would claim the title "Prince of Jin" in 317 and declare himself emperor in 318, thus continuing Jin as the so-called Eastern Jin Dynasty).  Liu Cong created the former Jin emperor the Marquess of Huai'an, and he created Liu Yao the Prince of Qin and put him in charge of the western empire.

Around the new year of 317, Shi Le defeated Liu Kun and took over his domain of Jin's Bing Province.  While this finally ended a former threat against Han Zhao, Shi's power became even stronger and independent of Liu Cong's.

In spring 317, Liu Can finally readied his plan to eliminate his uncle Crown Prince Ai.  He falsely informed Crown Prince Ai that Pingyang was under attack and that his subordinates should arm themselves to prepare for the attack.  Then, Liu Can informed his father that Crown Prince Ai was ready to attack—and when Liu Cong's messengers then saw Crown Prince's associates armed, they believed Liu Can's accusations and reported back to Liu Cong.  Liu Can then further interrogated Crown Prince Ai's subordinate Di and Qiang chiefs (whom Crown Prince Ai commanded, based on his secondary title of Grand Chanyu) under torture, and the Di and Qiang chiefs were forced to falsely confess to a plot.  Crown Prince Ai's associates and troops were all massacred—estimated at the cost of 15,000 men—and Crown Prince Ai was deposed and subsequently assassinated by Jin.  When Di and Qiang tribes subsequently revolted due to the treatment of their chiefs, Liu Cong sent Jin to suppress them, and Jin was successful.  In fall 317, Liu Cong created Liu Can crown prince.

In early 318, at a feast, Liu Cong had the former Jin emperor, the Marquess of Huai'an serve as butler, and a number of former Jin officials could not control themselves and cried out loud at their former emperor's humiliation.  Further, around this time, there were a number of uprisings against Han Zhao, each claiming to want to capture Liu Can to exchange him for the former Jin emperor.  Liu Can therefore recommended that Sima Ye be executed, and Liu Cong agreed, executing him after receiving Liu Can's report.

In summer 318, an imperial meeting hall in Pingyang was destroyed by a great fire, and it killed 21 people, including Liu Cong's son Liu Kang (劉康) the Prince of Kuaiji.  Liu Cong was said to have greatly mourned his son, and this appeared to have a terrible effect on his health.  He summoned Liu Yao and Shi Le to the capital to serve as regents, but both Liu Yao and Shi declined.  He died soon after, and Liu Can became emperor.  Later that year, however, Liu Can would be murdered by Jin, who would then massacre the imperial clan.  Liu Yao and Shi defeated Jin and Liu Yao became emperor, but Liu Yao and Shi subsequently had a falling out, leading to Shi declaring independent and creating Later Zhao.  The empire that Liu Cong had built was torn into halves.

Personal information 
 Father
 Liu Yuan (Emperor Guangwen) (fourth son of)
 Mother
 Consort Zhang
 Wives
 Empress Huyan (created 310, d. 312), mother of Crown Prince Can
 Empress Zhang Huiguang (created and d. 313)
 Empress Liu E (created 313, d. 314)
 Multiple empresses after Liu E's death—see Liu Cong's later empresses
 Upper Empress Jin Yueguang (靳月光), daughter of Jin Zhun (created and committed suicide 315)
 Left Empress Liu, likely Liu E's sister or cousin (created 315)
 Right Empress Jin Yuehua (靳月華), daughter of Jin Zhun (created 315)
 Upper Empress Fan (created 316)
 Left Empress Wang (created 318), adopted daughter of Wang Chen (王沈)
 Middle Empress Xuan (created 318), adopted daughter of Xuan Huai (宣懷)
 Major Concubines
 Consort Liu Ying (劉英), Liu E's sister (d. 312), daughter of Liu Yin (劉殷) the Duke of Dachang, posthumously honored as Empress Wude
 Four nieces of Liu E, may include Left Empress Liu, granddaughters of Liu Yin
 Consort Zhang, Empress Zhang Huiguang's sister
 Consort Wang, daughter of Wang Yu (王育)
 Consort Ren, daughter of Ren Yi (任顗)
 Consort Wang, daughter of Wang Zhang (王彰) the Duke of Dingxiang
 Consort Fan, daughter of Fan Long (范隆)
 Consort Ma, daughter of Ma Jing (馬景)
 Children
 Liu Can (劉粲), initially the Prince of He'nei (created 310), later the Prince of Jin (created 314), later Crown Prince (created 317), later emperor
 Liu Yi (劉易, note different character than his brother), the Prince of Hejian (created 310, d. 316)
 Liu Yi (劉翼, note different character than his brother), the Prince of Pengcheng (created 310)
 Liu Li (劉悝), the Prince of Gaoping (created 310)
 Liu Fu (劉敷), the Prince of Bohai (created 312, d. 316)
 Liu Ji (劉驥), the Prince of Ji'nan (created 312, executed 318)
 Liu Luan (劉鸞), the Prince of Yan (created 312)
 LIu Hong (劉鴻), the Prince of Chu (created 312)
 Liu Mai (劉勱), the Prince of Qi (created 312, executed 318)
 Liu Quan (劉權), the Prince of Qin (created 312)
 Liu Cao (劉操), the Prince of Wei (created 312)
 LIu Chi (劉持), the Prince of Zhao (created 312)
 Liu Heng (劉恆), the Prince of Dai (created 312)
 Liu Cheng (劉逞), the Prince of Wu (created 312, executed 318)
 Liu Lang (劉朗), the Prince of Yingchuan (created 312)
 Liu Gao (劉皋), the Prince of Lingling (created 312)
 Liu Xu (劉旭), the Prince of Danyang (created 312)
 Liu Jing (劉京), the Prince of Shu (created 312)
 Liu Tan (劉坦), the Prince of Jiujiang (created 312)
 Liu Huang (劉晃), the Prince of Linchuan (created 312)
 Liu Kang (劉康), the Prince of Kuaiji (d. 318)
 Liu Yue (劉約) (d. 318?)

References 

 Book of Jin, vol. 102.
 Spring and Autumn Annals of the Sixteen Kingdoms, vol. 1.
 Zizhi Tongjian, vols. 85, 86, 87, 88, 89, 90.

318 deaths
4th-century Chinese monarchs
Former Zhao emperors
Former Zhao generals
Jin dynasty (266–420) people
Year of birth unknown
Posthumous executions